Student Christian Movement may refer to one of the following national organizations:
 Australian Student Christian Movement
 Student Christian Movement of Canada
 Student Christian Movement of Great Britain
Indonesian Student Christian Movement
Student Christian Movement of the Philippines

It may also refer to the international umbrella organization:

 World Student Christian Federation

Christian ecumenical organizations
Christian youth organizations